U tvojim molitvama – Balade (trans. In Your Prayers – Ballads) is the first live album by Serbian and former Yugoslav singer-songwriter Đorđe Balašević. Recorded during Balašević's concert in Zetra (Sarajevo, November 1986), Ledena dvorana (Zagreb, November 1986), Sava Centar (Belgrade, December 1986), Studio M (Novi Sad, May 1987) and Šalata (Zagreb, July 1987), the album features live versions of Balašević's ballads. Some tracks feature Balašević's humorous monologues, and the tracks "Ne volim januar" and "Bezdan" feature recordings of Balašević's guest appearance in the Radio Novi Sad show Pop Ekspres. The album features the previously unrecorded "Samo da rata ne bude", recorded with a children's choir. The song lyrics warn about the war (which indeed will start three years later), delivering a hymn of pacifists throughout then still existing SFR Yugoslavia.

Track listing

Personnel
Đorđe Balašević – vocals
Dragan Jovanović – guitar (tracks: A1 to B3, D1 to D4)
Elvis Stanić – guitar (tracks: C1 to C4)
Aleksandar Kravić – bass guitar
Aleksandar Dujin – keyboards
Miroslav Karlović – drums

References

 EX YU ROCK enciklopedija 1960–2006, Janjatović Petar;

External links
U Tvojim Molitvama (Balade) at Discogs

1987 live albums
PGP-RTB live albums
Đorđe Balašević live albums